Mardi Khola Hydropower Station (Nepali: मार्दी खोला जलविद्युत आयोजना) is a run-of-river hydro-electric plant located in  Kaski District of Nepal. The flow from Mardi River, a tributary of Kali Gandaki River, is used to generate 4.8 MW electricity. The plant is owned and developed by Gandaki Hydropower Development Co. P. Ltd , an IPP of Nepal. The plant started generating electricity from 2066-10-08 BS. The generation licence will expire in 2098-10-07 BS, after which the plant will be handed over to the government. The power station is connected to the national grid and the electricity is sold to Nepal Electricity Authority.

See also
List of power stations in Nepal

References

Hydroelectric power stations in Nepal
Gravity dams
Run-of-the-river power stations
Dams in Nepal
Irrigation in Nepal
Buildings and structures in Kaski District